Brina Michelle Palencia (born February 13, 1984) is an American voice and television actress. She has voiced a number of English-language versions of characters featured in anime. 

Palencia provided the dubbed voices of Tony Tony Chopper in One Piece, Touka Kirishima in Tokyo Ghoul,  Vi Graythorn in Case Closed, Eve in Black Cat, Honoka Sakurai in Suzuka, Ai Enma in Hell Girl, Kazumi Yoshida in Shakugan no Shana, Kurumu Kurono in Rosario + Vampire, Ciel Phantomhive in Black Butler, Juvia Lockser in Fairy Tail, Holo in Spice and Wolf, Kazuhiro Mitogawa in Ga-Rei: Zero, Sakura Minamoto in Zombie Land Saga, Yuno Gasai in Future Diary, Miharu Rokujo in Nabari no Ou, Ruiko Saten in A Certain Scientific Railgun, Maho Minami in Beck: Mongolian Chop Squad, Ryoko Okami in Okami-san and Her Seven Companions, Minoru Mineta in My Hero Academia, and Isuzu Soma in Fruits Basket. On camera, she starred as Sophia in The CW series Star-Crossed and has appeared in The Walking Dead and Castle. In video games, she voices Mad Moxxi in the Borderlands series, and Ayra from Fire Emblem: Genealogy of the Holy War and Lute from Fire Emblem: The Sacred Stones in the 2017 mobile game Fire Emblem Heroes.

Biography
Palencia was born and raised in Oklahoma. As a child, she lived in Honduras until she was four. Throughout her childhood, she went back and forth between La Ceiba, Honduras and Owasso, Oklahoma.

She settled in Dallas, Texas and graduated from Weatherford High School in 2002. While studying at the University of North Texas, she was influenced by the anime series Dragon Ball Z. After graduating from UNT with a Bachelor of Arts in music in 2006, she began her career as a voice actress for Funimation. She was also a director, but eventually focused more on the acting side of the productions.

In her live-action work, she was the host of GameStop TV and has appeared in independent films, such as The Ladies of the House and Lumberjack Man. In 2014, she had a starring role as Roman's younger sister Sophia in The CW's science fiction romantic drama Star-Crossed. In 2017, she was credited with performing a parody version of Sarah McLachlan's "In the Arms of An Angel", titled "On the Wings of a Battmann," in a Cyanide & Happiness short of the same name.

Personal life
Her brother, Gino Palencia, works at Funimation as an ADR engineer and production assistant. She currently lives in Los Angeles with her husband Paul Wingo, who she was married to on January 5, 2013. On September 12, 2018, Palencia announced her pregnancy on Twitter that she was expecting her first child. She gave birth to a boy, Arthur Wingo, on February 1, 2019.

Filmography

Anime

Film

Video games

Live-action

References

External links

 
 
 Brina Palencia at CrystalAcids Anime Voice Actor Database
 
 

1984 births
Living people
Actresses from Dallas
Actresses from Los Angeles
Actresses from Oklahoma
American people of Honduran descent
American television actresses
American video game actresses
American voice actresses
American voice directors
Funimation
Hispanic and Latino American actresses
People from Denton, Texas
People from La Ceiba
People from Owasso, Oklahoma
University of North Texas alumni
21st-century American actresses